The 2012 Pacific-Asia Curling Championships were held from November 18 to 25 at the Naseby Curling Club in Naseby, New Zealand. The championships acted as the Pacific zone qualifiers for the World Curling Championships. The top two women's berths, China and Japan, qualified for the 2013 World Women's Curling Championship in Riga, Latvia, while the top two men's berths, China and Japan, qualified for the 2013 World Men's Curling Championship in Victoria, British Columbia.

Competition format
This edition of the Pacific-Asia Curling Championships will have a different competition format from previous Pacific-Asia Curling Championships, per World Curling Federation regulations. The men's tournament will have seven teams competing in a single round-robin format, while the women's tournament will have six teams competing in a double round-robin format. At the conclusion of the round robin tournaments, the top four men's and women's teams will play in the semifinals. The semifinal rounds will be best-of-three games for the men and best-of-five games for the women. For the men's semifinals, the game that the teams played in the round robin will be counted as the first game in the best-of-three series, while for the women's semifinals, the two games that the teams played in the round robin will be counted as the first and second games in the best-of-five series. The medal round, as in previous years, will consist of single games.

Men

Teams
The teams are listed as follows:

Round-robin standings
Final round-robin standings

Round-robin results
All draw times listed in New Zealand Standard Time (UTC+12).

Draw 2
Sunday, November 18, 14:00

Draw 5
Monday, November 19, 14:00

Draw 7
Tuesday, November 20, 9:30

Draw 9
Tuesday, November 20, 19:00

Draw 11
Wednesday, November 21, 14:00

Draw 14
Thursday, November 22, 14:00

Draw 16
Friday, November 23, 9:30

Playoffs

Semifinals

Game 2
Saturday, November 24, 9:00

Game 3
Saturday, November 24, 14:00

Bronze-medal game
Sunday, November 25, 14:00

Gold-medal game
Sunday, November 25, 14:00

Women

Teams
The teams are listed as follows:

Round-robin standings
Final round-robin standings

Round-robin results
All draw times listed in New Zealand Standard Time (UTC+12).

Draw 1
Sunday, November 18, 9:30

Draw 3
Sunday, November 18, 19:00

Draw 4
Monday, November 19, 9:30

Game forfeited by Kazakhstan due to time expiry. Kazakhstan had been leading 9–7 at the time.

Draw 6
Monday, November 19, 19:00

Draw 8
Tuesday, November 20, 14:00

Draw 10
Wednesday, November 21, 9:30

Draw 12
Wednesday, November 21, 19:00

Draw 13
Thursday, November 22, 9:30

Draw 15
Thursday, November 22, 19:00

Draw 17
Friday, November 23, 14:00

Tiebreaker
Friday, November 23, 18:30

Playoffs

Semifinals

Game 3
Saturday, November 24, 9:00

Game 4
Saturday, November 24, 14:00

Bronze-medal game
Sunday, November 25, 9:30

Gold-medal game
Sunday, November 25, 9:30

References
General

Specific

External links

2012 in curling
Pacific-Asia Curling Championships
Sport in Otago
International curling competitions hosted by New Zealand